David Loughery is an American screenwriter and producer.

Filmography
Writer:  
 Dreamscape (1984)
 The Stepfather (1987) (uncredited)
 Star Trek V: The Final Frontier (1989)
 Flashback (1990)
 Passenger 57 (1992)
 The Good Son (1993) (uncredited)
 The Three Musketeers (1993)
 Money Train (1995)
 Tom and Huck (1995)
 Lakeview Terrace (2008)
 Obsessed (2009)
 Penthouse North (2013)
 Nurse 3D (2013)
 The Intruder (2019)
 Fatale (2020)
 Shattered (2022)
 End of the Road (2022)

Producer:
 Flashback (1990) (Co-producer)
 Lakeview Terrace (2008) (Executive Producer)
 Obsessed (2009) (Executive Producer)
 Penthouse North (2013) (Producer)
 The Intruder (2019) (Executive Producer)
 Fatale (2020) (Executive Producer) 
 Shattered (2022) (Executive Producer)

References

External links
 

American male screenwriters
American film producers
Ball State University alumni
Living people
University of Iowa alumni
Year of birth missing (living people)